Made in Abyss is a Japanese anime television series based on the manga series of the same name written and illustrated by Akihito Tsukushi. The anime television series adaptation was announced in December 2016. The 13-episode series aired from July 7 to September 29, 2017, on AT-X, Tokyo MX, TV Aichi, Sun TV, KBS Kyoto, TVQ, Saga TV, and BS11., and covers content from volumes 1 through 3. The final episode was a 1-hour long special. The series was directed by Masayuki Kojima and written by Hideyuki Kurata, with animation by Kinema Citrus and character designs by Kazuchika Kise. Australian artist Kevin Penkin composed the soundtrack for the anime. Miyu Tomita and Mariya Ise performed both the opening theme "Deep in Abyss" and the ending theme "Tabi no Hidarite, Saihate no Migite", the latter in collaboration with Shiori Izawa). The first season premiered on Adult Swim's Toonami programming block starting on January 16, 2022.

A sequel was announced at an event in November 2017.

Following the release of the first compilation films, the sequel was revealed to be a film titled . The film premiered in Japan on January 17, 2020. The film had been set to premiere in the United States at Anime Boston on April 11, 2020, before that convention's cancellation due to the COVID-19 pandemic. Regular theater showings in the U.S. had been planned for April 13 (English dub) and 15 (English subtitles).

Following the release of Dawn of the Deep Soul, a new sequel has been announced. On May 5, 2021, it was announced that the sequel is a second season, officially titled , which aired from July 6 to September 28, 2022. The main cast and staff reprised their roles. The opening theme is "Katachi" by Riko Azuna while the ending theme is "Endless Embrace" by Myth & Roid.

A sequel to The Golden City of the Scorching Sun was announced on January 15, 2023.

Sentai Filmworks has licensed the series, and streamed it on Amazon's Anime Strike service in the U.S. and on Hidive outside of the U.S. Sentai has since released it on home video with an English dub. MVM Films has acquired the series for distribution in the UK and Ireland, and Madman Entertainment has acquired the series for distribution in Australia and New Zealand. Sentai Filmworks has licensed the two compilation films, and screened the first film at Regal Cinemas in Los Angeles on March 15, 2019, with a subtitled theatrical release on March 20, 2019, and an English-dubbed theatrical release on March 25, 2019, in collaboration with Fathom Events. During its panel at Anime Expo on July 5, 2019, Sentai Filmworks announced that they had acquired the license for Dawn of the Deep Soul. Sentai Filmworks planned to screen the film in North America, the United Kingdom, and Ireland with English subtitles on April 13, 2020, subtitled, and with the English dub on April 15, 2020, however, the screenings were postponed due to the COVID-19 pandemic. Sentai Filmworks also acquired the second season for distribution worldwide except Asia, France, Germany, Italy and Middle East and North Africa, and will stream it on select digital outlets.

Series overview

Episode list

Season 1 (2017)

Theatrical film trilogy (2019–20)
A four-part series of short films, called "Marulk's Daily Life", was produced along the third movie Made in Abyss: Dawn of the Deep Soul and shown before the movie's screenings in Japan. These short films include Marulk running a small errand with the help of Nat, as well as Marulk having a recollection of his scary past which reveals his first heartwarming encounter with Ozen.

Season 2: The Golden City of the Scorching Sun (2022)

Notes

References

External links
 

Made in Abyss